Hibbertia rufa, commonly known as brown guinea flower, is a species of flowering plant in the family Dilleniaceae and is endemic to south-eastern Australia. It is a weak, prostrate to scrambling shrub with wiry branches, linear leaves and yellow flowers with three or four stamens arranged in a cluster on one side of the two carpels.

Description
Hibbertia rufa is a weak, prostrate to scrambling shrub with wiry branches that sometimes form adventitious roots. The edges of the leaves are rolled under and there is a tuft of hairs on the tip. There are three or four stamens in a single cluster on one side of the two glabrous carpels, each with four ovules.

Taxonomy
Hibbertia rufa was first formally described in 1955 by Norman Arthur Wakefield in The Victorian Naturalist from specimens collected near the Cann River in 1948.

Distribution and habitat
This hibbertia mainly grows on the edges of swamps and in wet heathland in scattered locations on the coast and tablelands of New South Wales, in far eastern Victoria and near St Helens in north-eastern Tasmania.

Conservation status
Hibbertia rufa is classified as "rare" under the Tasmanian Government Threatened Species Protection Act 1995.

References

rufa
Flora of New South Wales
Flora of Tasmania
Flora of Victoria (Australia)
Plants described in 1955